Battalion (Batal'on) is a 2015 Russian war film directed by Dmitry Meskhiev that relates the story of the First Battalion of Death, a women-only Russian combat unit that fought in the First World War. Actress Mariya Aronova plays the role of real-life heroine Maria Bochkareva. Battalion was the biggest winner at the 2015 Golden Eagle Awards, winning four awards out of nine nominations.

Plot 
In the Spring of 1917, following the February Revolution, Russian troops fighting in the First World War are heavily demoralised. Military commanders decide to create a battalion of enthusiastic women volunteers, led by Maria Bochkareva. After basic military training, the women are sent to the front.

Cast
Mariya Aronova as Maria Bochkareva
Maria Kozhevnikova as Natalia Tatishcheva
Marat Basharov as Alexander Kerensky
Irina Rakhmanova as Froska
Yanina Malinchik as Dusya
Yevgeny Dyatlov as Tseplyaev
Valeria Shkirando as Vera Neklyudova
Dmitry Shevchenko as Peter Polovtsov
Vladimir Zaytsev as General Alekseev
Mila Makarova as Tonya

Release 

Battalion led the number of nominations at the 2015 Golden Eagle Awards. It lost Best Motion Picture to Anna Melikian's Pro Lyubov, but nevertheless won 4 awards: Best Actress in a Supporting Role for Maria Kozhevnikova, Best Music Score, Best Editing and Best Sound Editing.

In March 2016, a longer version of the film, split into 4 episodes, was broadcast on Russian television.

References

External links
 

2015 films
2010s war films
2010s historical films
Russian war films
Russian historical films
Military of Russia in films
World War I films based on actual events
Films about military personnel
Films directed by Dmitry Meskhiev
Films scored by Yuri Poteyenko
Russian World War I films